Carlos Henrique dos Santos Souza, also known as Henrique (born 2 May 1983 in São Gonçalo, Rio de Janeiro) is a Brazilian footballer who currently plays defender for Vitória.

Career
He joined the French club from Flamengo during the summer of 2005. On 31 March 2007, he scored at the 89th minute the goal that ensured Bordeaux's win 1–0 over Lyon in the final of the Coupe de la Ligue.

Honours
Bordeaux
Ligue 1: 2008–09
Coupe de France: 2012–13
Coupe de la Ligue: 2006–07, 2008–09
Trophée Des Champions: 2008, 2009

References

External links
 

1983 births
Living people
Brazilian footballers
Brazilian expatriate footballers
CR Flamengo footballers
FC Girondins de Bordeaux players
Fluminense FC players
Campeonato Brasileiro Série A players
Ligue 1 players
Expatriate footballers in France
People from São Gonçalo, Rio de Janeiro
Association football defenders
Sportspeople from Rio de Janeiro (state)